Dihydrophloroglucinol is a chemical compound found in the pathway of the microbial degradation of phloroglucinol and other phenolic compounds.

The enzyme phloroglucinol reductase uses dihydrophloroglucinol and NADP+ to produce phloroglucinol, NADPH, and H+. It is found in the bacterium species Eubacterium oxidoreducens.

References 

Cyclohexenols
3-Hydroxypropenals